Perekatny is a rural locality (a settlement) in Yablonovskoye Rural Settlement of Takhtamukaysky District, the Republic of Adygea, Russia. The population was 238 as of 2018.

Geography 
The settlement is located near Krasnodar, 24 km north of Takhtamukay (the district's administrative centre) by road. Novaya Adygeya is the nearest rural locality.

References 

Rural localities in Takhtamukaysky District